Michal Katya Adler (born 3 May 1972) is a British journalist. She has been the BBC's Europe editor since 2014.

Early life
Adler was born on 3 May 1972 in Hampstead, north London, to German parents. She attended the independent, fee-paying South Hampstead High School. She studied German and Italian at the University of Bristol. During her course, in her year abroad, she undertook a number of work placements including at Blue Danube Radio, Reuters, NBC in Turkey, and at the Rome offices of The Times. While at university, Adler was the president of the political society and started its magazine. She graduated in 1995. One of her dissertation topics was denazification.

Career
After graduating, Adler initially briefly worked for The Times before moving to Vienna in August 1995 to work for Mondial Congress, an organiser of International Congresses. She began working as a correspondent for Austrian national public broadcaster ORF in late 1995, reporting locally and then internationally from Kosovo, Eastern Europe and across Southwest Asia and North Africa.

Adler joined the BBC in Vienna in 1998, reporting on Austrian and Central European affairs. After becoming the BBC's Berlin correspondent for a short period, from 2000 she was based in London for the BBC World Service presenting on European current affairs, and commuting weekly to Berlin to work as a news anchor for Deutsche Welle Television.

From August 2003, she was the BBC Madrid correspondent, travelling around Europe, Southwest Asia and North Africa to cover stories including the deaths of Pope John Paul II and Palestinian leader Yasser Arafat in a Paris hospital. Adler also reported on the Madrid train bombings. She admitted in an interview in 2019 that she had lied about being able to speak Spanish to get the Madrid correspondent job. Adler later learned the language by listening to Spanish political radio and Mexican soap operas.

From December 2006 Adler was the BBC's Middle East correspondent, based in Jerusalem but reporting around the region from Gaza, the West Bank, Lebanon, Syria, Jordan and Libya. During this period she was also an occasional presenter or interviewer on HARDtalk.

Adler has also presented a number of one-hour documentaries, such as Mexico's Drug Wars for BBC2. Her film Spain's Stolen Babies was runner-up for an RTS award in 2012.

At the end of April 2014 she was appointed the BBC's Europe editor, replacing Gavin Hewitt. Her appointment was controversial because her LinkedIn profile stated that for 15 years she had regularly facilitated conferences for a number of clients including one for the European Union. This brought about criticism from Conservative Party MPs, including  Andrew Bridgen and Philip Davies. Davies stated: "this cosy relationship between the BBC and the European Commission severely undermines your editorial integrity and ability to report matters in a strictly objective manner." The BBC in written response clarified that Adler had at the time been working freelance for the BBC and a number of other broadcast organisations, and in 19 years had only been paid to chair one EU event in 2005, invited by the UK presidency, not the European Commission.

In early February 2017, the BBC broadcast a documentary by Adler titled After Brexit: the Battle for Europe in which she examined the mounting challenges facing the European Union over the next few years. In June 2017 Adler became one of the four presenters of Brexitcast, a BBC podcast covering Brexit. In September 2019, Brexit Newscast became a regular television broadcast fixture on BBC One, usually following Question Time, as of December 2020.

As of 2019, Adler was paid between £205,000-£209,999, placing her on the list of the highest-paid BBC news and current affairs staff.

Criticism of Michael Gove
In September 2020 the BBC partially upheld a complaint against Adler after she sent a series of tweets on 28 April 2020 stating that an "observation" put forward by Cabinet Office Minister Michael Gove was "delusional". Gove had stated "the COVID crisis, in some respects, should concentrate the minds of EU negotiators". In addition, Adler's analysis also altered Gove's words, changing the term "should" to "will" in her tweets. The BBC Editorial Complaint Unit ruled that although Adler backed up her opinion with detailed evidence and was entitled to state it, her use of the word "delusional" broke the guidelines' licence for "professional judgements, rooted in evidence".

Awards
Adler was awarded honorary doctorates from Bristol University (LL.D) and the University of London (D.Lit) in July 2017.

She was awarded the Charles Wheeler award for Outstanding Contribution to Broadcast Journalism in 2019. She has also been awarded Broadcast Journalist of the Year 2018 at the PSA, Political Studies Association; Broadcast Journalist of the Year 2019 jointly with Laura Kuenssberg by the London Press Club; Listeners Choice Award at British Podcast awards 2019 for the Brexitcast podcast. In 2019 she was listed in the Evening Standard as one of London's most influential people, and by Politico magazine as one of Brussels top 20 most influential women in 2017.

Personal life
Adler is married and has three children. As well as English, she speaks German, Spanish, Italian, French, and basic Arabic and Hebrew.

References

External links

Journalisted – Articles by Katya Adler

1972 births
Living people
British people of German descent
Alumni of the University of Bristol
BBC newsreaders and journalists
BBC World Service presenters
British women television journalists
British radio presenters
British women radio presenters
People educated at South Hampstead High School
People from Hampstead